

Jean-Baptiste Forqueray (3 April 1699 – 28 June 1782), the son of Antoine Forqueray, was a player of the viol and a composer.

Forqueray was born in Paris. He is most famous today for his 1747 publication of twenty-nine pieces for viol and continuo which he attributed to his father (except for three, for which he himself took credit). In the avertissement he states that he was responsible for the bass line (thus the figures as well) and the viol fingerings. Stylistically, they are very much influenced by Italian music and belong to the generation of Jean-Marie Leclair (1697–1764) and Jean-Pierre Guignon (1702–1774). Modern violists regard these Pieces de viole as the most virtuosic music for the instrument. Paolo Pandolfo and Lorenz Duftschmid have both recorded the complete publication.

Forqueray published the same pieces for harpsichord, possibly in arrangements made by his wife Marie-Rose, in 1749 (ed. Colin Tilney, Paris, 1970) but remarkably did not transpose any of the music, so the melodies lie relatively low in the range of the harpsichord.

Forqueray's pupils included Louis XV's daughter Princesse Henriette-Anne and the future King Frederick William II of Prussia. Forqueray was married twice: to Jeanne Nolson on 29 July 1732 and, after her death, to the harpsichordist Marie-Rose Dubois on 13 March 1741. He died in Paris.

Selected recordings
Pièces de clavecin, Michael Borgstede, clavecin. 2 CD Brilliant Classics 2008.

References

Further reading
Lucy Robinson, Jean-Baptiste Forqueray, New Grove Dictionary of Music and Musicians (1980)

External links

French male classical composers
French Baroque viol players
18th-century French male classical violinists
French Baroque composers
Musicians from Paris
1699 births
1782 deaths
18th-century classical composers
18th-century French composers
17th-century male musicians